Iron Hand may refer to:

 Iron hand (prosthesis), a kind of prosthetic limb popular in Europe in the 15th-19th centuries
 Goetz von Berlichingen Iron Hand (c. 1480–1562), German Imperial Knight and mercenary
 "Iron Hand" (song), 1991 Dire Straits song
  Iron Hand Society, a Syrian nationalist group organized in 1921
 Iron Palm or Iron Hand, a body of training techniques in various Chinese martial arts
 Operation Iron Hand, a US military operation conducted during the Vietnam War
 "Iron Hand", a song by Battle Beast from their album Steel
 "Iron Hand", a song by Grand Magus from their album The Hunt
 The Iron Hand, the U.K. edition of The Iron Clew, a 1947 novel by Phoebe Atwood Taylor
 A 1970s comic strip drawn by Irish artist Paddy Brennan
 The original name of the 1960s U.S. Air Force mission Wild Weasel
 An alternative name for the Claw of Archimedes

See also 
 Iron Hands (disambiguation)
 Iron Fist (disambiguation)
 The Iron Hand of Mars, a 1992 historical mystery crime novel by Lindsey Davis